The Cell Phone Freedom Act (formally An Act respecting the locking of cellular telephones) was a private member's bill proposed twice to the Parliament of Canada which would have required mobile phone providers remove the SIM lock from devices once a customer reaches the end of their contract.

It was first introduced on June 17, 2010 in the House of Commons of Canada as Bill C-560 by Bruce Hyer, then the New Democratic Party Small Business Critic and Member of Parliament for Thunder Bay—Superior North. Bill C-560 was expired due to the government's defeat in March 2011. Hyer reintroduced the Cell Phone Freedom Act under the new session of parliament on November 3, 2011, as Bill C-343.

Provisions 

The Cell Phone Freedom Act, if passed, would have mandated that: 
 consumers buying new cell phones in Canada must be informed of the existence of any SIM lock (also known as a network lock) on their phone before sale;
 wireless phone companies must unlock handsets upon request, without fee, when a consumer purchases a new phone outright (unsubsidized) without a contract;
 wireless phone companies must unlock handsets upon request, without fee, when a consumer comes to the end of their contract, or at any time thereafter.
Under the proposed legislation, wireless service providers may still employ such locks on customer phones while under contract, so it is unlikely to impact the common practice of offering subsidized phones on contracts.

Results 

Rogers Wireless (and its sub-brand Fido Solutions) announced on December 15, 2010 that they would start offering to unlock all of their customers handsets for a flat fee of $50, in response to public pressure on the issue. The other two major national carriers, Bell Mobility and Telus Mobility, and their sub-brands followed suit in early 2011 provided that the device operated on their network as well as having a postpaid account for at least 90 days.

While the bill never became law, SIM locking was ultimately banned in Canada on December 1, 2017 as part of amendments to the Canadian Radio-television and Telecommunications Commission's Wireless Code. All new devices in Canada must be sold unlocked, and carriers must offer to unlock existing phones free-of-charge.

References

External links 
 The Wireless Code, simplified

Proposed laws of Canada
Mobile telecommunications
2010 in Canadian law